The Gasman is a 1941 German comedy film directed by Carl Froelich and starring Heinz Rühmann, Anny Ondra and Walter Steinbeck. It was shot at the Tempelhof Studios in Berlin and premiered in the city's Gloria-Palast. The film's sets were designed by Walter Haag. It was made by Froelich's separate production unit, and distributed by the major studio UFA.

Cast
 Heinz Rühmann as Hermann Knittel
 Anny Ondra as Erika Knittel
 Walter Steinbeck as Herr - der nicht erkannt sein möchte
 Erika Helmke as Blondes Fräulein Lilott
 Will Dohm as Schwager Alfred
 Franz Weber as Judge
 Kurt Vespermann as Prosecutor
 Hans Leibelt as Defense lawyer
 Charlotte Susa as Schöne Zeugin
 Gisela Schlüter as Entzückende kleine Frau
 Herbert Bach as Kellner
 Luise Bethke-Zitzman as Knittels Nachbarin
 Paul Bildt as Nervenarzt Dr. Brauer
 Fritz Draeger as Mann im Zugabteil
 Paul Esser
 Hugo Froelich as Taxifahrer
 Wilhelm Große as Auskunftsbeamter
 Wolfgang Heise
 Bruno Hellwinkel as Polizeibeamter
 Otto Krieg-Helbig as Polizeibeamter
 Wilhelm P. Krüger as Flickschneider
 Walter Lieck as Bankdiener
 Manfred Meurer as Verdächtiger Jüngling
 Herta Neupert as Mopsgesicht
 Erik Radolf as Kriminalbeamter
 Marga Riffa as Beamtin der Sittenpolizei
 Rolf Rolphs as Polizeibeamter
 Max Rosenhauer
 Oscar Sabo as Pensionierter Schutzmann
 Ernst Stimmel as Bankdirektor
 Eleonore Tappert as Zimmervermieterin
 Eva Tinschmann as Frau Maschke
 Hans Ulrich as Bankangestellter
 Egon Vogel as Beamter für Verkehrsunfälle
 Ewald Wenck as Kriminalbeamter
 Hermine Ziegler as Frauenberaterin Janette Knoll
 Bruno Ziener as Vornehmer alter Herr
 Reinhard Kolldehoff as Polizeibeamter
 Kurt Seifert as Finanzbeamter
 Helmut Weiss as Romantischer Jüngling

References

Bibliography 
 Bock, Hans-Michael & Bergfelder, Tim. The Concise CineGraph. Encyclopedia of German Cinema. Berghahn Books, 2009.

External links 
 

1941 films
Films of Nazi Germany
German comedy films
1941 comedy films
1940s German-language films
Films directed by Carl Froelich
UFA GmbH films
Films based on works by Heinrich Spoerl
German black-and-white films
Films shot at Tempelhof Studios
1940s German films